Kodakara is a town in the Thrissur district of Kerala state in South India. Administratively, Kodakara is part of Kodakara Panchayat and Chalakudy Taluk. Kodakara Panchayat is part of Chalakudy assembly constituency and Chalakudy (Lok Sabha constituency).

Kodakara Hawala Scandal
After a few weeks of 2021 Kerala Legislative Assembly election result day, allegations came against the BJP leadership of Kerala for carrying illegal black money (Hawala), which was related to 2021 election. The money was seized at Kodakara. The Kerala Police handed over the case to Enforcement Directorate. The money was looted at Kodakara on 3 April 2021, just 3 days before the election. The police revealed that the actual amount was Rs 3.5 Crore and it was brought for the BJP's election campaign. BJP state president K. Surendran was the chief accused in the case. The UDF alleged that it was due to the mutual understanding between LDF and BJP that the Kerala Police didn't investigate it first.

References

Cities and towns in Thrissur district